Radoje Pajović (14 April 1934 — 2 June 2019) was a Yugoslav and Montenegrin historian who worked at the Institute of History at the University of Montenegro for forty years. Internationally, he has been dubbed "the most prominent historian of the [World War II] period in Montenegro" and one of the most prominent Montenegrin historians in general. He received the "13 July Award" from the National Assembly of Montenegro and "19 December Award" from the city of Titograd, the capital of Montenegro. His most notable works were  [Counterrevolution in Montenegro: The Chetnik and Federalist Movements 1941–1945] published in 1977,  [Pavle Đurišić: Controversial Chetnik Duke], first published in 1987 and then supplemented and expanded and re-published in 2005, and  [Montenegro Through History] also published in 2005. He was the author or co-author of twelve books, the editor of more than twenty, and published around one hundred articles and other contributions. He was among those Montenegrin historians who refused to engage in historical revisionism to rehabilitate the World War II Chetniks who collaborated with the Axis powers, despite this being a trend in the 1990s.

Early life, education and family 
Radoje Pajović was born on 14 April 1934 in the village of Drenovštica in the Nikšić municipality of Zeta Banovina in the Kingdom of Yugoslavia, the son of Ilija and Stana ( Perunović). He did not remember his mother because she died when he was young. His father later married a woman named Ljubica. He completed elementary school in Drenovštica. His family was actively involved in the anti-fascist struggle in Montenegro during World War II, and in his childhood associated himself closely with the movement on an emotional level.

He completed high school in Nikšić, then in 1957 commenced studying at the Department of History at the University of Belgrade Faculty of Philosophy. He spent a year working in the archives of the Central Committee of the League of Communists of Montenegro, before commencing work the following year at the Institute of History at the Pedagogical College in Cetinje (later the Faculty of Philosophy, University of Montenegro). He received his doctorate from the University of Belgrade in 1970, and his doctoral dissertation was entitled Četnički federalistički pokret u Crnoj Gori 1941–1945 [The Chetnik Federalist Movement in Montenegro 1941–1945]. Pajović married Ljilja, and they had two children: a daughter, Tanja; and a son, Neven. Ljilja died in 2013 and the loss affected him a great deal.

Career and legacy
Pajović worked at the Institute of History for forty years from 1958 until his retirement in 1997. As a historian, he mainly concentrated on the modern history of Montenegro, specialising in World War II, for which he was "highly respected both at home and abroad", according to the historian Marijan Mašo Miljić. In his later career, Pajović explored the earlier history of Montenegro, including the medieval Duklja state and Zeta province. He authored or co-authored twelve books, the most notable of which were  [Counterrevolution in Montenegro: The Chetnik and Federalist Movements 1941–1945] published in 1977,  [Pavle Đurišić: Controversial Chetnik Duke], first published in 1987 and then supplemented and expanded and re-published in 2005, and  [Montenegro Throughout History] also published in 2005. The first two works have been particularly valued by historians, with the historian Kenneth Morrison described his book on Đurišić as an "excellent analysis". He also edited more than twenty books, published around one hundred articles and other contributions, and made a "significant contribution to Montenegrin historiography", according to Miljić. He participated in the writing of the history of the League of Communists of Yugoslavia and the history of the League of Communists of Montenegro, was the president of the Association of Historians of Montenegro and a member of the presidency of the Association of Historians of Yugoslavia. He was also a member of many expert panels, committees and commissions. He was the recipient of many awards, including the "19 December Award" in 1977 from the city of Titograd, the capital of the Socialist Republic of Montenegro, and the "13 July Award" the following year from the National Assembly of Montenegro for his contributions to science. He was a founding member of the Doclean Academy of Sciences and Arts, Matica crnogorska and Montenegrin PEN during the difficult period of the breakup of Yugoslavia. According to Miljić, Pajović made a major contribution to the Institute of History over forty years.

He has been praised for his objective writing about collaboration with the Axis powers in Montenegro during World War II without being affected in his research by his family's active involvement in the struggle against fascism. In the 1990s, in the countries that emerged from the dissolution of Yugoslavia, a politically-motivated popular trend in historiography was the historical rehabilitation of World War II figures who collaborated with the Axis powers and were involved in massacres of civilians during the war. Pajović was one of the historians who refused to engage in historical revisionism in favor of the collaborationist Chetniks, despite it being a trend in the 1990s. In the political struggles that followed, he fiercely opposed any attempt to rehabilitate the Chetniks and those that pursued Greater Serbia policies. These included attempts to erect monuments in honor of Pavle Đurišić, an Axis collaborator who committed many massacres in the Sandzak region of Montenegro, and Puniša Račić, a Montenegrin Serb politician who murdered three and wounded two more Croat politicians on the floor of the National Assembly of the Kingdom of Serbs, Croats and Slovenes in June 1928. He also spoke out against the 2015 rehabilitation by the Serbian Supreme Court of the World War II Chetnik leader Draža Mihailović, which Pajović considered unfounded.

Pajović belonged to a group of Montenegrin historians who consistently advocated for the independence of Montenegro and affirmed Montenegrin ethnicity. He also claimed that historical evidence confirms the existence of an autocephalous Montenegrin Orthodox Church, and that it had been unlawfully abolished by force by Prince Regent Alexander of Yugoslavia in 1920. He also wrote that Montenegro had been violently annexed by the Kingdom of Serbia in 1918. Pajović advocated for Montenegro to be a "free, civil democratic, socially just and multi-religious and multicultural society". In January 2019, Pajović stated that Serbian clero-nationalist circles were spreading false information claiming that the human rights of Serbs in Montenegro were in danger. He roundly condemned as gross and false propaganda the 2019 assertion by the Patriarch of the Serbian Orthodox Church, Irinej, that the situation of Serbs in Montenegro was worse than in the genocidal Independent State of Croatia during World War II. Pajović also condemned the insults made by Amfilohije, the Serbian Orthodox Metropolitan of Montenegro towards Montenegrins, in which Amfilohije stated that Montenegrins were "oxen", "faeces", and "bastards" of the World War II Montenegrin Partisan leader Milovan Djilas. Pajović accused the same clero-nationalist groups of historical revisionism against the anti-fascist struggle in Montenegro and its legacy.

Pajović died suddenly on 2 June 2019, aged 85, and was buried the following day at the Čepurci cemetery in Podgorica. In December 2019, the Association of Fighters and Anti-Fascists in Nikšić organised a tribute to Pajović, led by the historian Živko Andrijašević. Andrijašević stated that Pajović's most significant work was his 1977 book Kontrarevolucija u Crnoj Gori: četnički i federalistički pokret 1941—1945 [Counterrevolution in Montenegro: The Chetnik and Federalist Movements 1941–1945], and asserted that its conclusions had stood the test of time. Andrijašević went on to say that Pajović did not modify his historical conclusions for political purposes, but remained true to the facts. At the same event, the historian Adnan Prekić stated that no-one explained Yugoslav political movements during the interwar period and World War II as well as Pajović. Andrijašević concluded by decrying the fact that the event had to be organised by the Association of Fighters and Anti-Fascists and not by the Institute of History, and condemned Pajović's former colleagues at the Institute who specialised in World War II history for not attending the event, stating that this was indicative of a malaise within the study and teaching of history in Montenegro. According to Miljić, Pajović's historical work constitutes a significant legacy. Internationally, Pajović has been acknowledged as the most prominent historian of the events of World War II in Montenegro, and one of the most prominent Montenegrin historians in general.

Selected bibliography

As sole author

As co-author

Footnotes

References 
 
 
 
 
 
 
 
 

1934 births
2019 deaths
Montenegrin historians
University of Belgrade Faculty of Philosophy alumni
Writers from Nikšić